Archeological Site No. 121--59 are historic sites in Stephensons Landing, Maine and are part of the Penobscot Headwater Lakes Prehistoric Sites.
The sites were added to the National Register of Historic Places on October 31, 1995.

References

		
National Register of Historic Places in Piscataquis County, Maine